Deh Barin (also Romanized as Deh Barīn and Dehbarīn) is a village in Qatruyeh Rural District, Qatruyeh District, Neyriz County, Fars Province, Iran. At the 2006 census, its population was 96, in 24 families.

References 

Populated places in Neyriz County